Arthur Mounteney (11 February 1883 – 1 June 1933) was an English professional footballer and cricketer.

Mounteney was born in Loughborough, Leicestershire. He played as an inside forward for Leicester Fosse, Birmingham, Preston North End and Grimsby Town in the Football League. He played nearly 100 matches for Birmingham, and scored the club's last goal at their Muntz Street ground before they moved to St Andrew's in December 1906.

Mounteney played as a right-handed batsman and occasional bowler for Leicestershire County Cricket Club from 1911 to 1924, scoring 5306 runs, including six centuries, at an average of 20.80.

He died in Leicester aged 50.

References

External links

1883 births
Footballers from Leicester
1933 deaths
English footballers
Association football forwards
Leicester City F.C. players
Birmingham City F.C. players
Preston North End F.C. players
Grimsby Town F.C. players
Portsmouth F.C. players
Hinckley United F.C. players
English Football League players
Leicestershire cricketers
English cricketers